"I've Got Joy" is a song by American gospel singer CeCe Winans, which was released on May 13, 2022, as the third single from her first live album, Believe for It (2021). The song was written by Kyle Lee and Phil Wickham.

"I've Got Joy" peaked at number 26 on the US Hot Christian Songs chart, and number 12 on the Hot Gospel Songs chart. At the 2022 GMA Dove Awards, "I've Got Joy" was nominated for the GMA Dove Award for Inspirational Recorded Song of the Year.

Background
On April 1, 2022, CeCe Winans released the deluxe edition of Believe for It, containing additional studio versions of previously released songs and a new song titled "I've Got Joy." Wickham shared the story behind the song, saying:

Composition

Accolades

Commercial performance
After being released to Christian radio, "I've Got Joy" made its debut at number 50 on the US Christian Airplay chart dated June 4, 2022.

"I've Got Joy" debuted at number 42 on the US Hot Christian Songs chart dated July 9, 2022.

"I've Got Joy" debuted at number 19 on the US Hot Gospel Songs chart dated January 7, 2023.

Music videos
On April 12, 2022, CeCe Winans released the official audio video for the song. On June 23, 2022, CeCe Winans released the official lyric video for "I've Got Joy".

Charts

Weekly charts

Year-end charts

Release history

References

External links
  on PraiseCharts

2022 singles
2022 songs
CeCe Winans songs